The German term Panzerfaust (Tank-fist) is a name given to a World War II-era disposable recoilless single-shot light anti-tank launcher, referring to their warheads having a caliber larger than their launcher tube, making them protrude like a fist.

Panzerfaust may also refer to:
 Panzerfaust 2, a Cold War-era reloadable anti-tank rocket launcher, also known as the Panzerfaust 44 Lanze
 Panzerfaust 3, a A modern day-era semi-disposable anti-tank rocket launcher

The success of the Panzerfaust during WWII popularised the name and may refer to the following:

Military 
 Fliegende Panzerfaust, a very-short-range interceptor developed by Zeppelin during World War 2 to intercept Allied bomber aircraft
 Operation Panzerfaust, the German military invasion of Hungary in October 1944

Music 
 Panzerfaust Records, a Minnesota-based white supremacist record label
 Panzerfaust (album), an album by the Norwegian black metal band Darkthrone
 Panzerfaust (band), a Canadian black metal band
 Panzerfaust (song), a song by industrial band KMFDM on its 2011 album WTF?!

Other 
 Panzerfaust Magazine, a periodical (1967-1982) about wargaming